Marguerite Louise Skliris-Alvarez ( Skliris; born April 7, 1922), known by her stage name Margia Dean (name is pronounced as Mar-juh) is an American former beauty queen and stage and screen actress of royal Greek descent, who had a career in Hollywood films from the 1940s until the early 1960s, appearing in 30 starring in roles and 20 bit parts.

Biography

Early life and modelling
She was born in Chicago, Illinois but moved to San Francisco, California with her parents at a young age. She began acting at the age of 7, appearing on stage in many child roles and later won the Women's National Shakespeare Contest for her role as Juliet in a production of Romeo and Juliet. She also took up modelling and was named "Miss San Francisco" and "Miss California" in 1939. She was a top-five runner-up to Patricia Donnelly in the "Miss America 1939" competition.

Theatre
After her modelling, she was told that had she stayed in New York, she would have been on Broadway, but as her mum was working returned back to San Francisco, to finish her education. She did, however, start her career in the theatre genre, working with the Geary and Curren Theatre and then with the Biltmore Theatre in Los Angeles.

Film career
She made her feature film debut in Casanova in Burlesque (1944) and adopted her stage name, Margia Dean. Although never under contract to a studio, and worked variously at Republic Pictures. ;;Columbia Pictures and Paramount Pictures,  but for the majority of films, where with both 20th Century Fox and some 16 in all, for Lippert Pictures under the producer Robert L. Lippert, and she became known as the Queen of Lippert 

Her first leading role was in Shep Come Home (1948) and roles followed in Red Desert (1949), FBI Girl (1951), The Lonesome Trail (1955), Villa!! (1958) and Seven Women from Hell (1961). Dean starred in a 1958 western, Ambush at Cimarron Pass, that featured Clint Eastwood in one of his earliest film roles. She also portrayed a trapeze artist in the 1961 circus tale The Big Show, which starred Esther Williams and Robert Vaughn.

Her association with Lippert had led to her being cast in The Quatermass Xperiment (1955), the first Hammer horror film. Frustrated that her roles were predominantly in B movies, she eventually retired from acting following her marriage in 1965 to her second husband, architect Felipe Alvarez. Her final film was Moro Witch Doctor She briefly became involved in movie production, creating '"Margo Productions" producing The Long Rope (1961) with Hugh Marlowe as well as a number of television pilots. She has since been vice-president of a real estate firm and has worked in costume design and interior decoration.

 Filmography 

 Casanova in Burlesque (1944)
 Call of the South Seas (1944)
 Take It Big (1944)
 The Desert Hawk (1944)
 Accent on Crime (1944)
 Minstrel Man (1944)
 Earl Carroll Vanities (1945)
 The Power of the Whistler (1945)
 Crime Doctor's Warning  (1945)
 Who's Guilty? (1945)
 Living in a Big Way (1947)
 Shep Comes Home (1948)
 I Shot Jesse James (1949)
 Rimfire (1949)
 Grand Canyon (1949)
 Ringside (1949)
 Treasure of Monte Cristo (1949)
 Tough Assignment (1949)
 Red Desert (1949)
 The Baron of Arizona (1950)
 Western Pacific Agent (1950)
 Motor Patrol (1950)
 Hi-Jacked (1950)
 The Return of Jesse James (1950)
 Bandit Queen (1950)
 Fingerprints Don't Lie (1951)
 Mask of the Dragon (1951)
 Tales of Robin Hood (1951)
 Pier 23 (1951)
 Kentucky Jubilee (1951)
 Inside the Walls of Folsom Prison (1951)
 Savage Drums (1951)
 Take Care of My Little Girl (1951)
 Leave It to the Marines (1951)
 Sky High (1951)
 FBI Girl (1951)
 Superman and the Mole-Men (1951)
 Mr. Walkie Talkie (1952)
 Loan Shark (1952)
 Mesa of Lost Women (1953)
 Sins of Jezebel (1953)
 Fangs of the Wild (1954)
 The Lonesome Trail (1955)
 The Quatermass Xperiment (1955)
 Last of the Desperados (1955)
 The Revolt of Mamie Stover (1956)
 Frontier Gambler (1956)
 Stagecoach to Fury (1956)
 Badlands of Montana (1957)
 Ambush at Cimarron Pass (1958)
 Villa!! (1958)
 The Secret of the Purple Reef (1960)
 The Big Show (1961)
 7 Women from Hell (1961)
 Moro Witch Doctor'' (1964)

References

External links 
 

1922 births
20th-century American actresses
21st-century American women
Actresses from California
Actresses from Chicago
Actresses from Illinois
Actresses from San Francisco
American centenarians
American film actresses
American people of Greek descent
Female models from California
Female models from Illinois
Living people
Miss America 1930s delegates
Models from Chicago